Malcolm Biggs (7 July 1904 – 1 August 1972) was an Australian cricketer. He played in six first-class matches for Queensland between 1927 and 1931.

See also
 List of Queensland first-class cricketers

References

External links
 

1904 births
1972 deaths
Australian cricketers
Queensland cricketers
Cricketers from Queensland